The John Elway Stadium is a 4,000-seat sports stadium on the campus of Granada Hills Charter High School in Granada Hills, California, a district of the city of Los Angeles in the San Fernando Valley.

The stadium is named after the legendary Denver Broncos quarterback John Elway, who attended his final two years of high school there.

It is the main stadium for the Granada Hills Charter High School football, athletics (track and field) teams and the Los Angeles Rampage women's soccer team. It is also the former home ground of the San Fernando Valley Quakes USL Premier Development League soccer team.

References

Athletics (track and field) venues in Los Angeles
American football venues in Los Angeles
High school football venues in California
Soccer venues in Los Angeles
E